Exposure in magic refers to the practice of revealing the methods of magic tricks.  

The practice is generally frowned upon amongst magicians, who believe that it ruins the experience of magical performances for audiences.

Exposure is uniquely impactful to magicians, as magic relies heavily on the elusive nature of secrets and methods in order to create mystery.

Background
Magic effects have been exposed by both professional and amateur magicians. Some magic effects have been exposed in stage shows, and in other public media including television, the Internet, certain video sharing interfaces, discussion forums, and blogs.

One notable case of exposure on network television involved Val Valentino, performing as the "Masked Magician" in the Fox series Breaking the Magician's Code: Magic's Biggest Secrets Finally Revealed, which ran between 1997 and 1998. Valentino was ostracized by the magic community and received much criticism from magicians for contravening the joint International Brotherhood of Magicians and Society of American Magicians ethics statement. 

Penn & Teller have often exposed their own tricks for the purposes of entertainment. Penn Jillette has stated that while the duo show the audience how a trick is done, it is often done so quickly or with different mechanics that the audience is unable to follow.  This highlights the need to distinguish apparent exposures performed by magicians during an act, which often turn out to be illusions in their own right.

Arguments

Supporting exposure

Opposing exposure

See also
Intellectual rights to magic methods
List of magic tricks
Magicians' Alliance

References

Magic (illusion)
Trade secrets
Secrecy